Zhenis Kembayev (Jeñıs Mūhtarūly Kembaev; born on 25 February 1975) is a professor of law at the KIMEP University, Almaty, Kazakhstan.

Education
He graduated with honors from the Al-Farabi Kazakh National University in 1997. The same year he was awarded a scholarship of the German Academic Exchange Service (DAAD) for one-year academic study in Germany. In 1998, he obtained a Master of Law (LL.M, magna cum laude) degree from the University of Hamburg and in 2002, a Ph.D. degree in law from the Al-Farabi Kazakh National University.

In 2003–2004 he was a Fulbright scholar at the Southwestern University School of Law (Los Angeles, USA) and in 2007–2008 an Alexander von Humboldt Foundation fellow at the Europa-Institut of the University of Saarland (Saarbruecken, Germany) and at the Max Planck Institute for Comparative Public Law and International Law (Heidelberg, Germany).

In 2008, he earned his second doctorate in law (Dr. iur., magna cum laude) from the University of Cologne.

Teaching and research career
Kembayev joined KIMEP in 2004 and teaches courses in Public International Law, Law of the European Union and Constitutional Law.

His research interests are connected with legal issues related to: (a) the regional integration processes within the Eurasian Economic Union and the Collective Security Treaty Organization; (b) the operation of the Shanghai Cooperation Organisation; (c) the EU constitutional and external relations law; and (d) constitutional law of Kazakhstan and comparative constitutional law.

Since 2015, Kembayev is a Jean Monnet Chair in European and International Law. In 2016–2017, he was selected as a Weiser and a Grotius Research Fellow at the University of Michigan and in 2018, a Research Fellow at the National University of Singapore.

He is the author of several books and is active in publishing in internationally recognized peer-review journals. He has presented papers at scores of legal conferences and public hearings around the world.  Professor Kembayev also serves on several advisory editorial boards, including Review of Central and East European Law and Osteuropa-Recht.

References

External links
 Google Scholar Profile
 ResearchGate Profile

Living people
University of Cologne alumni
University of Hamburg alumni
Academic staff of KIMEP University
Max Planck Institute for Comparative Public Law and International Law people
1975 births
Al-Farabi Kazakh National University alumni
University of Michigan fellows